James Michael Colclough (March 31, 1936 – May 16, 2004) was an American football end in the American Football League (AFL).

Colclough played college football at Boston College.  He then played one season (1959) in the Canadian Football League with the Montreal Alouettes (11 games in 1959) and was an original Boston Patriot in the American Football League's inaugural 1960 season.  Colclough's ten receptions for touchdowns, and 21.7 yards per reception in 1962 earned him a spot on that year's American Football League All-Star team.  He is a member of the Boston Patriots All-Decade 1960s Team.

Colclough had 283 receptions for 5,001 yards and 39 touchdowns for the Boston Patriots over the 1960–1968 seasons.  He caught a two-point pass in the Patriots 43–43 tie with the Oakland Raiders at Fenway Park on October 16, 1964, and caught a two-point pass in the Patriots 24–14 loss to the Buffalo Bills at Fenway Park on December 20, 1964.

As an end, he had four career carries for 51 yards and had two runs of 16 yards during the 1961 AFL season.

In the late 1960s Colclough partnered with NHL star Derek Sanderson and famous "bachelor" Joe Namath as a proprietors of the "Bachelors III" restaurant.

See also
 List of American Football League players

1936 births
2004 deaths
American football ends
Canadian football ends
American players of Canadian football
Boston College Eagles football players
Boston Patriots players
Montreal Alouettes players
American Football League All-Star players
Sportspeople from Medford, Massachusetts
Players of American football from Massachusetts